The Peixe River is a river of Goiás State in central Brazil.

It flows into the Corumbá River.

See also
List of rivers of Goiás

References
Brazilian Ministry of Transport

Rivers of Goiás